Antony and the Johnsons is an American music group presenting the work of Anohni, then known as Antony Hegarty, and her collaborators.

Career
British experimental musician David Tibet of Current 93 heard a demo and offered to release Anohni's music through his Durtro label. Anohni started the band, its name inspired by trans activist Marsha P. Johnson. The debut album, Antony and the Johnsons, was released in 1998. In 2001, while still known as Antony Hegarty, Anohni/Hegarty released a short follow-up EP, I Fell in Love with a Dead Boy, which, in addition to the title track, included a cover of "Mysteries of Love", a David Lynch/Angelo Badalamenti song and "Soft Black Stars", a Current 93 cover.

Producer Hal Willner heard the EP and played it to Lou Reed, who immediately recruited Hegarty for his project The Raven. Now gaining more attention, Hegarty signed to U.S.-based record label Secretly Canadian, and released another EP, The Lake, with Lou Reed guest-performing on one of the tracks. Secretly Canadian also re-released Hegarty's debut album in the United States to wider distribution in 2004.

Anohni's second full-length album, 2005's I Am a Bird Now, was greeted with positive reviews and significantly more mainstream attention. The album featured guest appearances by Lou Reed, Rufus Wainwright, Boy George, and Devendra Banhart, and circled themes of duality and transformation. I Am a Bird Now featured arrangements by Maxim Moston and Julia Kent and was mixed by Doug Henderson. In September 2005 Antony and the Johnsons were awarded the Mercury Prize for the best UK album of 2005. Rival Mercury nominees, and favorites for the prize, the Kaiser Chiefs suggested that Anohni got in on a technicality; despite the fact she was born in the United Kingdom she spent much of her time in the U.S.—although they later apologized for the suggestion that she wasn't a deserving winner.

In 2005, Antony and the Johnsons' single "Hope There's Someone" featured in the celebrated Spanish director Isabel Coixet's 7th film "The Secret Life of Words" "Hope There's Someone" went on to be arguably one of the bands most popular songs. The group then collaborated with experimental film-maker Charles Atlas and presented TURNING in November 2006 in Rome, London, Paris, Madrid, and Braga. Thirteen women from New York City were presented in intimate live video portraits during the course of the concert. The Guardian called the piece "fragile, life affirming, and truly wonderful (five stars)". Le Monde in Paris hailed TURNING as "Concert-manifeste transsexuel".

The 2007 film about Bob Dylan, I'm Not There, featured their cover of his song "Knockin' On Heaven's Door" on the soundtrack release.

Antony and the Johnsons' 5-song Another World EP was released on October 7, 2008. Antony and the Johnsons' third album, The Crying Light, was released on January 19, 2009, and went to No. 1 on the European Billboard charts. Anohni has described the theme of the album as being "about landscape and the future". Nature, death, love and the role of the artist were explored across ten tracks, which included the single "Epilepsy Is Dancing." The album was mixed by Bryce Goggin and included arrangements by Nico Muhly.

Ann Powers wrote of The Crying Light for the LA Times online, "it's the most personal environmentalist statement possible, making an unforeseen connection between queer culture's identity politics and the green movement. As music, it's simply exquisite—more controlled and considered than anything Antony and the Johnsons have done and sure to linger in the minds of listeners."

After touring throughout North America and Europe in support of their new album, Antony and the Johnsons presented a unique staging of The Crying Light with the Manchester Camerata at the Manchester Opera House for the 2009 Manchester International Festival. The concert hall was transformed into a crystal cave filled with laser effects created by installation artist Chris Levine. Antony and the Johnsons went on to present concerts with symphonies across Europe in Summer 2009, including the Opera Orchestra of Lyon, the Metropole Orchestra, Roma Sinfonietta and the Montreux Jazz Festival Orchestra. At Salle Pleyel in Paris, Anohni appeared in a costume designed for her by Riccardo Tisci of Givenchy.

After two sold-out concerts at the Sydney Opera House, Antony and the Johnsons ended their recent touring in February 2010 in Tokyo. Anohni, Johanna Constantine and William Basinski performed at the Sogetsu Hall with butoh master Yoshito Ohno, the son of the 103-year-old dancer Kazuo Ohno, whose image graces the cover of The Crying Light. Kazuo Ohno died in June of that year, and Anohni wrote an obituary for the dancer in The Guardian.

September 2010 saw the release of the Thank You For Your Love EP which includes covers of Dylan's "Pressing On" and Lennon's "Imagine". The Sun listed Thank You For Your Love as single of the week on August 27, 2010. Antony and the Johnsons performed "Thank You For Your Love" on both the Late Show with David Letterman and Later... with Jools Holland in support of the album's release.

In October 2010 Anohni was invited to "takeover" The Guardians music and arts page that ran for weeks leading up to the release of Swanlights, the band's 4th album. Stereogum placed Swanlights in its Top 50 Albums of the year at #8.
Swanlights was released on October 12, 2010, through Secretly Canadian and Rough Trade Records. Simultaneously, Abrams Books published a book edition of Swanlights featuring Anohni's drawings and collages with photography by Don Felix Cervantes.

In interviews around the world in 2010, Anohni described her work on Swanlights and The Crying Light as "a collision between joy and a sense of hopelessness". Anohni said she was struggling to come to terms with the idea that she was part of a society that was having a "virulent" impact on the earth. She suggested that the degradation of nature was partially a result of the subjugation of women and earth-based spiritual systems. Anohni also blamed the collapse of humanity's sustainable relationship with the earth in part on the rise of patriarchal religions that suggest the destiny of humanity to be "a paradise elsewhere". Interview Magazine describes Swanlights as "an emotional personal call for global, collective change".

In tribute to Kazuo Ohno, Antony and the Johnsons performed on October 30, 2010, at Lincoln Center's Avery Fisher Hall with the Orchestra of St. Luke's and featured the film "Mr. O's Book of the Dead" directed by Chiaki Nagano and starring Kazuo Ohno.

In January 2011, Anohni was a guest on Winterguest, a program on Dutch Television's VPRO channel and was interviewed by Leon Verdonschot.

In 2010–2011, the song "Her Eyes Are Underneath The Ground" from the album The Crying Light was chosen as one of the five stimuli that the International Baccalaureate Organization chose for the IB Theatre Arts PPP.

On January 26, 2012, the Museum of Modern Art in New York produced a sold-out performance by Antony and the Johnsons, entitled "Swanlights" after their fourth studio album, at Radio City Music Hall, a collaboration with laser artist Chris Levine and set designer Carl Robertshaw. The event was prefaced by a speech from Dr. Julia Yasuda, who said: "I am concerned about nature changing and dying. Won't you please help her? Otherwise the world will be too lonely". The New York Times described the concert as "Cries From the Heart, Crashing Like Waves". This collaboration was later staged at the Royal Opera House in London in 2013 for two days and at the Teatro Real in Madrid in 2014 for four consecutive days.

Antony and the Johnsons released a live symphonic album in August 2012 entitled Cut the World; it features a track called "Future Feminism", which consists of a speech in which Anohni disparages patriarchal religions and advocates for a shift towards feminine systems of governance as part of an effort to avert global ecological disaster.

On February 23, 2015, Anohni announced through her Facebook and official site the name of her new album, HOPELESSNESS, although no release date was provided. The album was mixed and co-produced by Hudson Mohawke, Oneohtrix Point Never and herself. It would be released under the moniker ANOHNI. It was described as an "electronic record with some sharp teeth".

In June 2015, Antony and the Johnsons performed at Dark Mofo in Tasmania, Australia, as a benefit in support of the Martu people of Parnngurr in Western Australia in their fight to prevent a uranium mine from being developed near their community by Canadian multinational Cameco and Mitsubishi. Anohni appeared with Martu representatives at a press conference at the MCA in Sydney and on ABC's Q&A in further service of this cause.

In May 2016, HOPELESSNESS was released by Anohni on Secretly Canadian and Rough Trade.

Band members
Current members include:
 Anohni – lead vocals, piano
 Julia Kent (previously of Rasputina) – cello
 Parker Kindred – drums
 Jeff Langston – bass
 Doug Wieselman – horns
 Maxim Moston – violin, arrangement
 Rob Moose – guitar, violin
 Gael Rakotondrabe  – piano
Thomas Bartlett – piano

Previous members have included:
 Baby Dee – harp
 Joan Wasser – violin
 Reuben Butchart – piano
 Tahrah Cohen

Bibliography
 Antony and the Johnsons, Swanlights, Abrams Image, 2010
 Jerome Solal, La Voix d'Antony, Le Mot et le Reste, 2011

Awards 
{| class=wikitable
|-
! Year !! Awards !! Work !! Category !! Result !! Ref.
|-
| rowspan="4" | 2005
| Mercury Prize
| rowspan=2|I Am a Bird Now
| rowspan=2|Album of the Year 
| 
|
|-
| Shortlist Music Prize
| 
|
|-
| Antville Music Video Awards
| "Hope There's Someone"
| Best Video 
| 
|
|-
| MOJO Awards
| rowspan="4" | Antony and the Johnsons
| Best New Act 
| 
|
|-
| rowspan="7"|2006
| Danish Music Awards
| Best International Newcomer 
| 
|
|-
| rowspan=4|PLUG Awards
| Artist of the Year 
| 
|
|-
| Live Act of the Year
| 
|
|-
| "Hope There's Someone"
| Song of the Year 
| 
|
|-
| rowspan=2|I Am a Bird Now
| Album of the Year 
| 
|
|-
| Meteor Music Awards
| Best International Album
| 
|
|-
| GLAAD Media Awards
| rowspan="2" | Antony and the Johnsons
| Outstanding Music Artist 
| 
|
|-
| rowspan=2|2009
| rowspan=2|Rober Awards Music Poll
| Best Songwriter 
| 
|
|-
| "Crazy in Love"
| Best Cover Version
| 
|
|-
| rowspan=2|2010
|Best Art Vinyl
|Swanlights
| Best Art Vinyl 
| 
| 
|-
| Sweden GAFFA Awards
| rowspan="3"|Antony and the Johnsons
| Best Foreign Solo Act
| 
| 
|-
| 2011
| GLAAD Media Awards
| Outstanding Music Artist 
| 
|
|-
| rowspan=2|2012
| Lunas del Auditorio
| Best Foreign Rock Artist 
| 
|
|-
| UK Music Video Awards
| rowspan=2|"Cut the World"
| Best Alternative Video – UK 
| 
|
|-
| 2013
| Music Video Festival
| Best International Video
| 
|

Discography
Studio albums

Live albums

Soundtrack albums

Singles and EPs

References

Musical groups established in 1998
LGBT-themed musical groups
Musical groups from New York (state)
Rough Trade Records artists
Torch singers
People from Chichester
Secretly Canadian artists
Art pop musicians
1998 establishments in New York City